The Nhandiroboideae are a paraphyletic basal group of genera in the Cucurbitaceae, or gourd family, of flowering plants. The Nhandiroboideae comprise all members of the Cucurbitaceae that do not belong to the Cucurbitoideae.

References

Cucurbitaceae
Rosid subfamilies